Stefania Carmine (born 13 December 1966) is a Swiss former racing cyclist. She was the Swiss National Road Race champion in 1982.

References

External links
 

1966 births
Living people
Swiss female cyclists
Sportspeople from Ticino